The Stadion Narodowy im. Kazimierza Górskiego, known for sponsorship reasons as the PGE Narodowy since 2015 (with patron being added in 2021), is a retractable roof football stadium located in Warsaw, Poland. It is used mostly for concerts and football matches and is the home stadium of Poland national football team.

With a seating capacity of 58,580, the stadium is the largest association football arena in Poland. Its construction was started in 2008 and was finished in November 2011. It is located on the site of the former Stadion Dziesięciolecia, at the Zieleniecka Avenue in Praga Południe district, near the city center. The stadium has a retractable PVC roof which unfolds from a nest on a spire suspended above the centre of the pitch. The retractable roof is inspired by the cable-supported unfolding system of Commerzbank-Arena in Frankfurt, Germany, and is similar to the newly renovated roof of BC Place in Vancouver, British Columbia, Canada. The stadium is also very similar to the Arena Națională in Bucharest in terms of age, capacity and the roof.

The National Stadium hosted the opening match (a group match), the 2 group matches, a quarterfinal, and the semifinal of the UEFA Euro 2012, co-hosted by Poland and Ukraine.

The stadium is equipped with a heated pitch, training pitch, façade lighting, and underground parking. It is a multipurpose venue that is able to host sporting events, concerts, cultural events, and conferences. The official stadium opening took place on 19 January 2012, and the first football match was played on 29 February 2012. The match between the Poland national football team and the Portugal national football team ended with a 0–0 draw.

The stadium hosted the 2014–15 UEFA Europa League final.

On 11 November, 2022, the stadium was ordered closed with immediate effect due to construction issues with the roof.

Stadium specifics

Construction and architecture

The general contractor of the National Stadium was a German-Austrian-Polish consortium led by Alpine Bau and made up of Alpine Bau Deutschland, Alpine Construction Poland, PBG SA and Hydrobudowa Poland SA. The completion date was set for 24 months from the signing of the contract and the construction process involved approximately 1,200 employees.

The stadium has a capacity of 58,580 seats for spectators during football matches and up to 72,900 during concerts and other events (including 106 sites for disabled people). The total volume of the stadium (without the roof) is more than 1,000,000 m2 and the total area is 204,000 m2. The retractable roof structure is 240 × 270 m and the central spire stands at a height of 124 metres above the River Vistula and 100 m above the pitch. The total length of the lower promenade is 924 meters. The stadium has the largest conference center in Warsaw with a capacity of 1600 people including 25,000 m2 of commercial office space. Underground parking for 1765 cars is located beneath the pitch. The stadium contains restaurants, a fitness club, a pub, and 69 luxury skyboxes.

The National Stadium is a multi-sports facility that allows for the organization of sporting events, concerts and cultural events. In addition, it will also serve as an office, market place, hotel, gastronomic point and have other uses. As a result, it is expected that about 2000 to 3000 people will visit the stadium every single day.

Facade
The stadium's façade refers to the Polish national colors, resembling a waving flag of Poland and it consists of silver and red colors. The same palette was used to color the stadium's seating. The facade which consists of painted mesh that was imported from Spain, covers the inner aluminum and glass elevation. The stadium is an open structure, which means the lack of a closed facade, so the temperature inside is similar to the environmental temperature, despite the closed roof construction. Such a construction allows for natural ventilation of rooms placed under the stands and access to natural light.

Elevations are stretched on a powerful construction of the pipes that were manufactured in Italy. This structure is completely independent from the concrete stand construction and it is fundamental to the retractable stadium's roof. Thanks to this, designers could freely design the space under the stands.

The pitch
The stadium is equipped with a heated pitch. The pitch is installed with a lawn of Dutch grass, cultivated in Heythuysen, the Netherlands. During the organization of events such as concerts, the pitch will be covered with special panel, which must be removed within 5 days of its installation. A second option: to install a grass field on a special floating platform, was discarded due to it being too expensive.

The grandstands
The National Stadium was designed by the German-Polish consortium gmp Architects von Gerkan, Marg and Partners, J.S.K Architekci Sp. z o.o. and sbp—schlaich bergermann und partner (the design by Volkwin Marg and Hubert Nienhoff with Markus Pfisterer, Zbigniew Pszczulny, Mariusz Rutz, Marcin Chruslinski).

The structure is composed of two-level stands—top and bottom—with a capacity for 58,580 spectators. All seating in the National Stadium was provided by Polish company Forum Seating (part of the Nowy Styl Group located in Krosno). There are 900 seats for media and press, more than 4,600 so-called "premium seats", designed for special guests, 106 seats for disabled people and more than 800 seats in the VIP lodges.

Under the stands, there are changing rooms, conference halls and living areas with a total area of 130 000 m2. The building has eight stories with varied heights. The highest point at the stands, is located 41 meters above the former 10th-Anniversary Stadium pitch, while the highest point of the steel roof structure is 70 meters above that level. The roof can cover not only the stands, but also the pitch.

Retractable roof
Partially transparent, the retractable roof was made of fibreglass covered with teflon. This kind of material is resistant to weather factors (rain, the heat of the sun, and can hold up to 18 cm of wet snow) and the crease tendency. The production technology comes from German company Hightex GmbH, and the textile was produced in Bangkok by the Asia Membrane Co. Ltd.

The process of opening or closing the roof takes about 20 minutes and it can only be performed at temperatures above 5 °C and not during rain (this was the reason for a one-day postponement of the football match against England on 16 October 2012). A drive system is used for stretching the membrane during the process of opening and for folding the material during the process of closing the roof. The total weight of the steel-cables supporting the roof structure is 1,200 tons. Under the roof there are four LED display screens, each with an area of 200 m2.

Construction history

Preparations

On 1 February 2008, the consortium of JSK Architects Ltd., GMP—von Gerkan, Marg und Partner Architekten and SBP—Schleich Bergermann und Partner presented a conceptual design (visualization and scale model) of a new stadium.

The first pre-construction work began on 15 May 2008 when 126 concrete piles were driven into the soil of the basin of the old stadium's grandstand. On 18 June 2008, the National Sports Centre Ltd submitted documents required to obtain a construction permit from the governor of Masovia. This was approved on 22 July 2008, and on 26 September 2008, an agreement with Pol-Aqua SA to implement the first stage of construction work was signed. A few days later, on 7 October 2008, the construction of the stadium began.

On the construction site, close to the National Sports Centre, an outdoor webcam was installed. Broadcasting started on 31 October 2008 and people could track the progress of construction. Since the start of the second stage of construction on 29 June 2009, the entire process was also viewable from a second camera installed on a tower at Washington Roundabout. Images from the cameras are still available on the official websites of the stadium.

Main process

The first stage of construction included the demolition of concrete structures of the 10th-Anniversary Stadium, preparation of the ground, driving about 7000 concrete piles into the soil, construction of 6700 gravel and concrete columns, and the building of approximately 900 construction piles that now form the foundation of the stadium.

On 9 March 2009 the pile driving process was completed, and exactly one month later, opening of the offers from companies wishing to implement the second stage of the stadium construction took place. The best offer was introduced by German-Austrian-Polish consortium of companies - Alpine Bau Deutschland AG, Alpine Bau GmbH and Alpine Construction Poland Ltd., Hydrobudowa Poland SA and PBG SA and it was worth zl 1,252,755,008.64.

At the end of September, the first construction elements were visible from outside the stadium. The cornerstone (foundation stone) and a time capsule were set during the ceremony held on 7 October 2009. The time capsule contained flags of Poland, the European Union and the city of Warsaw, newspapers of the day, coins, banknotes, and other artifacts.

At the end of January, the first element of the roof structure arrived at the construction site.
This element was 1 of 72 that became part of the massive steel roof structure. Each of them weighs about 48 tons and is 12.5 meters tall. The completion of installation of all prefabricated elements took place by 13 August 2010, which represented the entire structure of the stadium stands. Ten days later all concrete works were finished.

On 16 December 2010 at the headquarters of the National Sports Centre a press conference took place dedicated to the so-called ‘big lift operation’ at the stadium. The conference discussed the main principles of the process, one of the most technologically advanced operations in the world and the first such project in Europe. No major problems occurred during this operation and ‘big lift’ was finalized on January 4, 2011. On this occasion, in the presence of Prime Minister Donald Tusk and Mayor of Warsaw Hanna Gronkiewicz-Waltz, a ceremony of symbolic topping-out was held.

Completion and opening

The National Stadium was originally planned to be completed on 30 June 2011. The stadium was scheduled to be opened to the public on July 22, 2011, while its official opening was scheduled to take place on August 27.
Due to ongoing construction, the event was moved to January 2012 and only an inaugural illumination of the facade of the stadium took place in August. A match against the Germany national football team had been scheduled on 6 September 2011 but this was relocated to Gdańsk, because the National Stadium wasn't ready yet.

Construction work was officially completed on 29 November 2011. One day later, Rafał Kapler - The NCS President submitted to the site manager an application needed to get a certificate of occupancy. The official opening ceremony of the stadium took place on 29 January 2012. The event was celebrated by concerts by Polish celebrities: Voo Voo and Haydamaky, Zakopower, Coma, T. Love, Lady Pank and ended with an evening fireworks show. On 10 February 2012, installation of heating and irrigation systems and the pitch installation was completed.

Prior to the opening of the stadium, the new street on its northern side was named for Ryszard Siwiec, who committed suicide by self-immolation in protest against the Warsaw Pact invasion of Czechoslovakia at the Stadion Dziesięciolecia in 1968.

Transport

Railways and metro
The stadium is located near the railway station Warszawa Stadion. The station has two side platforms flanking the suburban tracks of the Warsaw Cross-City Line used by the regional trains run by Koleje Mazowieckie and Szybka Kolej Miejska. The stadium can be reached by the S1 and S2 lines. The trip from central Warsaw takes about 5 minutes, and during the rush hours trains run every 4 minutes. Within an hour about 26000 people could reach stadium only by trains. In early 2012, the station has undergone thorough modernization in preparation for the new stadium and for the UEFA Euro 2012.

The stadium is accessible from the Warsaw Metro. The closest station is Stadion Narodowy metro station (C14) opened in March  2015.

Buses and trams
Around the stadium there are several tram and bus stops. The most convenient way to reach the stadium from the city centre is to use the transport hub located at the George Washington Roundabout (Rondo Jerzego Waszyngtona).

Events

Poland national football team matches
On February 29, 2012, 100 days before the start of UEFA Euro 2012 tournament, the Poland national football team, played the inaugural match against the Portugal national team which ended with a goalless draw.

Euro 2012 matches
The stadium was one of the venues for the UEFA Euro 2012 hosted jointly by Poland and Ukraine. Three Group A matches, a quarter-final and a semi-final were played there (with the other matches in that group played at the Wrocław Stadium).

The following matches were played at the stadium during the UEFA Euro 2012:

American football
On July 15, 2012, two weeks after the UEFA Euro 2012, the National Stadium hosted the VII SuperFinal PLFA (more commonly known as the Polish Bowl), the championship game of the Polish American Football League.

Science Picnic
The stadium is the venue for the Science Picnic, an annual science education fair, since 2013. During the 2013 Science Picnic, the stadium was visited by 142,573 people, which was at the time record attendance at any type of event held at the stadium.

2014 FIVB Volleyball Men's World Championship
On August 30, 2014, the National Stadium hosted the opening ceremony and match (Poland vs. Serbia) of the 2014 FIVB Volleyball Men's World Championship. Poland beat Serbia in front of 61,500 spectators – a new record for an FIVB volleyball match.

|}

Speedway
The stadium also host Motorcycle speedway with the Speedway Grand Prix of Poland as Round 1 of the 2015 Speedway Grand Prix series which was held there on 18 April. Poland's popular and most recent World Champion Tomasz Gollob has been granted a Wild Card entry to the Grand Prix.

Concerts

See also
 Kazimierz Górski
 Warsaw Chopin Airport
 Warsaw-Modlin Mazovia Airport
 A2 motorway
 List of football stadiums in Poland
 Waldstadion
 Arena Națională
 Puskás Aréna

References

External links

 Stadion Narodowy Official Site 
 National Stadium, Warsaw
 Live Webcam
 Webcam
 Photo gallery
 Alternative architectural rendering of the new stadium as a 60,000-seater, including surroundings 

Sports venues completed in 2011
2012 establishments in Poland
Football venues in Warsaw
American football venues in Poland
Poland
UEFA Euro 2012 stadiums in Poland
Retractable-roof stadiums in Europe
Sports venues in Warsaw
Gerkan, Marg and Partners buildings
Convention centres in Poland
Sports venues completed in 2012
Speedway venues in Poland